The 1985-86 Full Members' Cup was the first edition of the tournament created to compensate for the ban on English clubs from European football following the Heysel Stadium disaster. It was won by Chelsea, who beat Manchester City 5–4 in the final at Wembley Stadium.

The tournament attracted just 21 entries from the 44 eligible clubs. Only five First Division clubs entered (Chelsea, Coventry City, Manchester City, Oxford United and West Bromwich Albion).

The second division teams who didn't enter were Barnsley, Blackburn Rovers, Huddersfield Town, Norwich City, Oldham Athletic and Wimbledon.

Southern section

First round

Group 1

Group 2

Group 3

Group 4

Semi-finals

Final

First leg

Second leg

Chelsea won 4–2 on aggregate.

Northern section

First round

Group 1

Group 2

Group 3

Sunderland qualified on penalties after both teams tied on aggregate and points.

Group 4

Semi-finals

Final

First leg

Second leg

Manchester City won 3–2 on aggregate.

Final

References

Full Members' Cup
Full